= Bairro Peixoto =

Human settlement in Brazil

Coordinates: 22°57′59″S 43°11′24″W

Bairro Peixoto is a region in Rio de Janeiro, Brazil, but it is not officially recognized as a neighborhood. Officially, it forms part of the neighborhood of Copacabana, but has distinct characteristics.
